Yosuke Asaji (born 24 May 1993) is a Japanese professional golfer.

Professional career
Asaji won the 2019 Asia-Pacific Diamond Cup Golf (a co-sanctioned event with the Asian Tour), to qualify for the 2019 Open Championship. He earned entry into that tournament through Monday qualifier. He finished the 2019 Open Championship in a tie for 67th place. Later in 2019 he won a five-way playoff at the ANA Open after making a birdie at the first extra hole.

Asaji has two wins on the Japan Challenge Tour.

Professional wins (5)

Japan Golf Tour wins (3)

1Co-sanctioned by the Asian Tour

Japan Golf Tour playoff record (1–0)

Japan Challenge Tour wins (2)

Results in major championships
Results not in chronological order in 2020.

"T" indicates a tie for a place
NT = No tournament due to COVID-19 pandemic

Results in World Golf Championships

"T" = Tied

References

External links
 

Japanese male golfers
Japan Golf Tour golfers
Sportspeople from Tokyo
1993 births
Living people